John Stumpe (c. 1525 – 3 May 1600) was the member of the Parliament of England for Malmesbury for the parliament of 1584.

References

External links 

Members of the Parliament of England for Malmesbury
English MPs 1584–1585
Year of birth uncertain
1520s births
1600 deaths